Brockman and Brokman may refer to:

People
 Ann Brockman (1896–1943) American painter
 Ann Brockman (writer) (c.1600-1660) English writer on medicine
 Benjamin T. Brockman (1831–1864), American Confederate Army officer
 Brent Brockman (born 1988), American soccer player
 Cecil Brockman (born 1984), American politician
 Charles Samuel Brockman (1845–1923), Australian explorer
 Charlie Brockman (1927–2005), American sportscaster
 Craig Brockman (born 1973), American record producer
 Edward Lewis Brockman (1865–1943), British colonial administrator
 Edmund Ralph Brockman (1828–1908), Australian politician
 Edmund Vernon Brockman (1882–1938), Australian politician
 George Julius Brockman (1850–1912), Australian explorer
 Helen Brockman (1902–2008), American fashion writer and designer
 Jake Brockman (disambiguation), several people
 James Brockman (1886–1967), American songwriter
 John Brockman (disambiguation), several people
 Jon Brockman (born 1987), American basketball player
 Lani Brockman (born 1956), American actress
 Leigh Brockman (born 1978), Australian rules footballer
 Peter Brockman (disambiguation), several people
 Robert Brockman (1941-2022), American businessman
 Ronald Brockman (1909–1999), Royal Navy admiral
 Shimshon Brokman (born 1957), Israeli Olympic sailor
 Slade Brockman (born 1970), Australian Senator
 Tallulah Brockman Bankhead (1902-1968), American actress
 Thomas Patterson Brockman (1797–1859), American politician
 William Brockman (disambiguation), several people

Fictional characters
 Kent Brockman, a character on The Simpsons

Places
 Brockman, California, an unincorporated community in Lassen County, California, United States
 Brockman Airport, an airport in Western Australia
 Brockman Building, a building in Los Angeles, California, United States
 Brockman Highway, a highway in Western Australia
 Brockman National Park, a national park in Western Australia
 Brockman River, a river in Western Australia
 Brockman 2 mine and Brockman 4 mine, mines in Western Australia

See also 
 Brockmann
 Kees Broekman